Agitpop is an art punk band from Poughkeepsie, New York. The band was formed in 1981 and began touring widely in 1983. They released four records on the Comm3, Twintone, and Rough Trade labels. Its members include Mark LaFalce, John deVries, and Rick Crescini. The band was part of a pioneer movement in the underground music community and was particularly known for its unusual song styles, instrumentation, and lyrical content within the rock genre.  The shows attracted celebrated members of the New York art scene including the Pop Art era photographer Billy Name.

The portmanteau Agitpop is derived from agitprop and is a conjugation of ‘agitation pop’, a now well-defined label that describes how popular music asserts political ideas and views. The band members were enamored with the idea and the origins of the word from the Russian Revolution and used the repetition and philosophy of it within pop culture. Agitpop as a term can be applied to the name of the band itself, but also translates well into the character of the songs themselves.

Agitpop members have often described their approach to music as ‘a unique brand of fractured pop, derived from the dismantling of rock as we knew it.' At the time Agitpop was making their first records, the description worked as a default definition of the approach to making music the band was taking, where provocative amalgam with strong melodic hooks and poignant lyrics prevailed. Keeping with their intents and keeping with the needs of the times to redefine rock music, the band was consequent in their approach and forged a style unique to the times. The live shows were a natural extension of the philosophy the band was following. Agitpop's performances were very confrontational. They alienated the audience or drew them in.

In a review from Trouser Press of one of the shows in the mid-1980s, Agitpop's unique stylistic approach to rock music was described with the phrase  ‘Free your mind…and your ass will follow'. The review followed them continually around throughout the band's existence. Whether they are put into the music categories of the times or not, they have had a strong influence on many younger bands, inspiring them to adopt a willingness ‘in dismantling’, or emancipating rock away from standard instrumentations and song styles.

Line Up 
John deVries, vocals, guitars, clarinet, various toys &  percussion
Rick Crescini, electric bass, Glockenspiel, melodica
Mark LaFalce, drums, percussion, guitars, and backup vocals

Band history

Origins 
Bands that influenced Agitpop in regard to songwriting style, instrumentation, and delivery in performance have been noted to be Gang of Four, The Red Krayola, The Clash, Captain Beefheart, and Wire. To this list one might add The Slits, whose repetitive and fragmented melodic lines tend to remind one of the clarinets. melodica, and glockenspiel lines in many Agitpop songs.

Agitpop's popularity was established mainly by college radio stations, musicians, artists, and hardcore audiophiles.  Their extensive touring proved to be one of the essential ingredients in changing the idea of what popular music should be. It was pre-Nirvana times and along with their touring partners (The Smashing Pumpkins, The Minutemen, GWAR, 10,000 Maniacs, Soul Asylum, Red Hot Chili Peppers, Sonic Youth, Dead Kennedys, Mercury Rev, The Pixies, etc.), the band members were happy to be a part of it.

Played at The Voodoo Manor, Poughkeepsie, NY in 82.
Played a show at Nag's Head w/ Zen Guerrilla in 89.

Breakup 
Agitpop disbanded in 1989.  They continued in various forms until just after the turn of the decade. The last official show is often stated as the reason for their disbanding. The band was scheduled to play a show at The Blue Note in Columbia, Missouri. On the previous day the bass player, Rick Crescini was diagnosed with tinnitus and was sent home for health reasons. Out of frustration with touring and due to band member conflicts, he stayed there.  The band honored their contract with the Blue Note by playing that night, albeit with their road manager playing electric bass. 

During the time that Agitpop was disbanded, several new band formations ensued.

Reunion 
Agitpop regrouped in 2006 and released a new album in 2010 titled The Comm3 Sessions.

Concert Cabaret Voltaire 
The first live performance after a pause of almost ten years took place at the famous Cabaret Voltaire in Zurich, Switzerland on Friday, July 13, 2007. The reunion show consisted of two very diverse sets. The first was appropriately titled "A Shotgun for a TV and an Eskimo Kiss". It consisted of a complete set of Agitpop classics including "The Co-Existence",  "On the Hudson", "Eskimo Kiss", "Ode to Mr. Average", "Top of the Stairs" and the characteristic "Reasons of State". In the true sense of "dismantling rock", there was no drum kit to be seen, only a slew of guitars, an out-of-tune piano, and many odd instruments.  Wind chimes, squeeze toys, and kiddie xylophones made abrupt appearances. All three members of Agitpop switched between instruments with exponentially increased dexterity in endless androgynous roles of noise making, proving to the audience that no one had lost his touch and nothing its freshness.

"God Bless America, Really?" was the title of the second set. Here Agitpop went back to the roots of the Russian Revolution: Agitprop.  Basically, this was a show that consisted of an American medley of "noises in the ether" penned and sung by Agitpop's drummer Mark LaFalce. The stage setting was designed by the bassist, and B Movie freak Rick Crescini.  It depicted the twin towers with American Indians falling out of the windows in a general statement against the trend of violence in politics of yesterday and today.  A monumental moment was reached when the trio sang out in unison the worst of choruses from "The "Fish" Cheer / I-Feel-Like-I'm-Fixin'-To-Die Rag" with a hell-no-we-wont-go attitude, making bare bones out of naked patriotism. Model planes hit the towers in a 9/11-style and the Indians fell out of the windows. One could say that this part of the reunion was a true Dada homage to Dadaism ala Cabaret Voltaire.

Discography

LPs
Feast of the Sunfish (Community 3 - 1985)
Back at the Plain of Jars (Community 3/Rough Trade - 1986)
Open Seasons (TwinTone - 1988)
Stick It! (TwinTone - 1989)
Agitpop' (18 Acres - 2007)

EPsPo-Town Tea Party'' (TwinTone - 1989)

On several songs, additional players were featured on the albums.

References

External links 
Agitpop

American post-punk music groups